Sarnowo may refer to

Sarnowo, Chełmno County in Kuyavian-Pomeranian Voivodeship (north-central Poland)
Sarnowo, Gmina Boniewo in Kuyavian-Pomeranian Voivodeship (north-central Poland)
Sarnowo, Lipno County in Kuyavian-Pomeranian Voivodeship (north-central Poland)
Sarnowo, Gmina Lubraniec in Kuyavian-Pomeranian Voivodeship (north-central Poland)
Sarnowo, Masovian Voivodeship (east-central Poland)
Sarnowo, Pomeranian Voivodeship (north Poland)
Sarnowo, Lidzbark County in Warmian-Masurian Voivodeship (north Poland)
Sarnowo, Nidzica County in Warmian-Masurian Voivodeship (north Poland)
Sarnowo, West Pomeranian Voivodeship (north-west Poland)